Bayra Koysha is the woredas in Wolayita Zone of the Southern Nations, Nationalities, and Peoples' Region in Ethiopia. Bayra Koysha was established in 2019 from the other surrounding woredas. The administrative town of this woreda is 
Beklo Segno.

Notes 

Wolayita
Districts of the Southern Nations, Nationalities, and Peoples' Region